Cư Króa is a commune (xã) in M'Drăk District, Đắk Lắk Province, Vietnam. As of 2007, the commune had a population of 2,936. Agricultural land area amounts to 1433.98 hectares with 16,152.39 hectares of natural forests of which 1319.38 hectares is protected.

The whole commune has 612 households and communal food production in 2007 amounted to 1424 tons.

References

Communes of Đắk Lắk province
Populated places in Đắk Lắk province